Peter Scott (born 9 September 1973) is an Australian sprint canoeist who competed in the late 1990s and early 2000s (decade). He won a bronze medal in the K-4 1000 m event at the 1997 ICF Canoe Sprint World Championships in Dartmouth.

Scott also competed in two Summer Olympics, earning his best finish of seventh in the K-4 1000 m event at Atlanta in 1996.

References

Sports-reference.com profile

1973 births
Australian male canoeists
Canoeists at the 1996 Summer Olympics
Canoeists at the 2000 Summer Olympics
Living people
Olympic canoeists of Australia
ICF Canoe Sprint World Championships medalists in kayak
20th-century Australian people